Syed Amir-uddin Kedwaii (born 1901 – 21 August 1973) was an advocate for the Pakistan Movement and a member of Muslim League. He was the designer of the flag of Pakistan.

Biography

Kedwaii completed his LL.B at Aligarh University.

He started his political career as an activist with the Khilafat movement. He was a member of the Khilafat Committee and was later made its Chief Leader. Maulana Shaukat Ali used to call him "My Lieutenant". After the termination of the Khilafat Movement, Maulana Shaukat Ali laid the foundation for the Khuddam e Ka'aba Association of which Kedwaii was appointed President of United Province.

In 1922, Kedwaii, in the leadership of Allama Raghib Ahsan, created the All India Muslim Youth League of which he was the Secretary General. There was a feeling of disappointment after the adoption of the Nehru Report by the All India Congress in 1928. Under such circumstances, the All India Muslim Conference was founded by the Indian Muslims whose president was Sir Agha Khan and Syed Ameer ud din Kedwaii, who started as a member and later became its Secretary.

Kedwaii joined the All-India Muslim League in 1936 and became a member of its Council in 1938. Kedwaii, along with his other companions in Aligarh, drafted the "Pakistan Scheme" on the basis of which the All India Muslim League developed the "Lahore Resolution" in 1940.

Kedwaii migrated to Pakistan in 1947 and settled in Lahore. He remained the faculty member of the Punjab University Law College and practiced law as a senior advocate.

Kedwaii was one of the founding members of Jamiat ul Ulemae Pakistan and participated in its meetings as its vice president.

Kedwaii had great spiritual affiliations with Data Ali Hajveri of Lahore. Because of this spiritual attachment, he remained in Lahore until his death on 21 August 1973.

In honour of his services in the Pakistan Movement, Kedwaii was awarded a posthumous Pakistan Movement Gold Medal in 1991 by the Government of Pakistan.

References

Flag designers
1973 deaths
1901 births
Pakistani lawyers
Muhajir people
Aligarh Muslim University alumni
Pakistan Movement activists
Lawyers from Lahore
Faculty of Law, Aligarh Muslim University alumni
20th-century Indian lawyers
20th-century Pakistani lawyers